
Gmina Skoki is an urban-rural gmina (administrative district) in Wągrowiec County, Greater Poland Voivodeship, in west-central Poland.

The gmina contains part of the protected area called Puszcza Zielonka Landscape Park.

Villages
Apart from the town of Skoki, Gmina Skoki contains the villages and settlements of Antoniewo Górne, Antoniewo-Leśniczówka, Bliżyce, Brzeźno, Budziszewice, Chociszewko, Chociszewo, Dzwonowo, Dzwonowo Leśne, Glinno, Grzybowice, Grzybowo, Ignacewo, Jabłkowo, Jagniewice, Kakulin, Kuszewo, Lechlin, Lechlin-Huby, Lechlinek, Łosiniec, Miączynek, Młynki, Nadmłyn, Niedarzyn, Niedźwiedziny, Pawłowo Skockie, Pomarzanki, Potrzanowo, Raczkowo, Rakojady, Rejowiec, Rościnno, Roszkówko, Roszkowo, Sława Wielkopolska, Sławica, Stawiany, Szczodrochowo and Wysoka.

Neighbouring gminas
Gmina Skoki is bordered by the gminas of Kiszkowo, Kłecko, Mieścisko, Murowana Goślina, Rogoźno and Wągrowiec.

References
Polish official population figures 2006

Skoki
Wągrowiec County